The 1983 NHL Entry Draft was the 21st NHL Entry Draft. It was held at the Montreal Forum in Montreal, Quebec, on June 8, 1983. The NHL Entry Draft is the primary means by which players arrive in the National Hockey League. The St. Louis Blues did not participate in this draft, shortly after the league blocked the franchise's relocation to Saskatoon, Saskatchewan. This was the only time in National Hockey League history that a franchise did not participate in an entry draft. This was also the last time a playoff team picked first overall until 2020, when the New York Rangers won the first selection.

The last active player in the NHL from this draft class was Claude Lemieux, who retired after the 2008–09 season.

Selections by round
Below are listed the selections in the 1983 NHL Entry Draft. Club teams are located in North America unless otherwise noted.

Round one

 The Pittsburgh Penguins' first-round pick went to the Minnesota North Stars as the result of a trade on October 28, 1982 that sent Anders Hakansson, Ron Meighan and Minnesota's 1st-rd pick in 1983 NHL Entry Draft in exchange for George Ferguson and this pick.  
 The New Jersey Devils' first-round pick went to the New York Islanders as the result of a trade on October 1, 1981 that sent Dave Cameron and Bob Lorimer to Colorado in exchange for this pick.  The Colorado Rockies relocated to New Jersey to become the Devils for the 1982–83 NHL season.
 The Los Angeles Kings' first-round pick went to the Buffalo Sabres as the result of a trade on March 10, 1981 that sent the Rick Martin to Los Angeles in exchange for Los Angeles' third-round pick in 1981 NHL Entry Draft and this pick.
 The St. Louis Blues' first-round pick went to the New Jersey Devils as the result of a trade on June 9, 1982 that sent Rob Ramage to St. Louis in exchange for St. Louis' first-round pick in 1982 NHL Entry Draft and this pick. 
 The Calgary Flames' first-round pick went to the Buffalo Sabres as the result of a trade on June 8, 1982 that sent Richie Dunn, Don Edwards and Buffalo's second-round pick in 1982 NHL Entry Draft to Calgary in exchange for Calgary's first-round and second-round picks in 1982 NHL Entry Draft, second-round picks in 1983 NHL Entry Draft along with Buffalo's option to swap first-round picks in 1983 NHL Entry Draft (this pick).
 The Quebec Nordiques' first-round pick went to the Buffalo Sabres as the result of a trade on June 8, 1983 that sent Tony McKegney, Jean-Francois Sauve, Andre Savard and Buffalo's 3rd-rd pick in 1983 NHL Entry Draft to Quebec in exchange for Real Cloutier and this pick.
 The Buffalo Sabres' first-round pick went to the Calgary Flames as the result of a trade on June 8, 1982 that sent Calgary's first-round and second-round picks in 1982 NHL Entry Draft, second-round picks in 1983 NHL Entry Draft along with Buffalo's option to swap first-round picks in 1983 NHL Entry Draft to Buffalo in exchange for Richie Dunn, Don Edwards and Buffalo's second-round pick in 1982 NHL Entry Draft.  Buffalo took option to swap which became this pick for Calgary.
 The Washington Capitals' first-round pick went to the Winnipeg Jets as the result of a trade on June 8, 1983 that sent Dave Christian to Washington in exchange for this pick.
 The Minnesota North Stars' first-round pick went to the Pittsburgh Penguins as the result of a trade on October 28, 1982 that sent George Ferguson and Pittsburgh's 1st-rd pick in 1983 NHL Entry Draft to Minnesota in exchange for Anders Hakansson, Ron Meighan  and this pick.
 The Philadelphia Flyers' first-round pick went to the Hartford Whalers as the result of a trade on August 19, 1982 that sent Mark Howe and Hartford's third-round in 1983 NHL Entry Draft to Philadelphia in exchange for Greg Adams, Ken Linseman,  Philadelphia's third-round in 1983 NHL Entry Draft and this pick.

Round two

 The Los Angeles Kings' second-round pick went to the Montreal Canadiens as the result of a trade on February 17, 1981 that sent the Rick Chartraw to Los Angeles in exchange for this pick.
 The St. Louis Blues' second-round pick went to the Montreal Canadiens as the result of a trade on March 9, 1982 that sent the Guy Lapointe to St. Louis in exchange for this pick.
 The Calgary Flames' second-round pick went to the Buffalo Sabres as the result of a trade on June 8, 1982 that sent Richie Dunn, Don Edwards and Buffalo's second-round pick in 1982 NHL Entry Draft to Calgary in exchange for Calgary's first-round and second-round picks in 1982 NHL Entry Draft, Buffalo's option to swap first-round picks in 1983 NHL Entry Draft along with this pick. 
 The Calgary Flames' second-round pick went to the Montreal Canadiens as the result of a trade on September 10, 1982 that sent the Doug Risebrough and Montreal's second-round pick in 1983 NHL Entry Draft to Calgary in exchange for Calgary's third-round pick in 1984 NHL Entry Draft and this pick.
 Calgary previously acquired this pick as the result of a trade on November 25, 1981 that sent Bobby Gould and Randy Holt to Washington in exchange for Pat Ribble and this pick.
 The Calgary Flames' second-round pick went to the Minnesota North Stars as the result of a trade on June 8, 1982 that sent the Mike Eaves and Keith Hanson to Calgary in exchange for Steve Christoff and an optional second-round pick in 1983 NHL Entry Draft (this pick) or in 1984 NHL Entry Draft.
 Calgary previously acquired this pick as the result of a trade on September 10, 1982 that sent Calgary's second-round pick in 1983 NHL Entry Draft and third-round pick in 1984 NHL Entry Draft to Montreal in exchange for Doug Risebrough and this pick.

Round three

 The Montreal Canadiens' third-round pick went to the Winnipeg Jets with $50,000 cash as compensation to allow Montreal to hire Serge Savard as the new General Manager on April 28, 1983.
 Montreal previously acquired this pick as the result of a trade on September 26, 1980 that sent Gilles Lupien to Pittsburgh in exchange for Montreal's option to swap third-round picks.
 The Hartford Whalers' third-round pick went to the Philadelphia Flyers as the result of a trade on August 19, 1982 that sent Greg Adams, Ken Linseman,  Philadelphia's first-round and third-round picks in 1983 NHL Entry Draft in exchange for Mark Howe and this pick.
 The New Jersey Devils' third-round pick went to the Montreal Canadiens as the result of a trade on March 10, 1981 that sent Bill Baker to Colorado in exchange for Montreal's option to swap fourth-round picks in 1984 NHL Entry Draft and this pick.  Colorado relocated to New Jersey on May 27, 1982.
 The Winnipeg Jets' third-round pick went to the New York Rangers as the result of a trade on September 8, 1981 that sent Doug Soetaert to Winnipeg in exchange for this pick.
 The Buffalo Sabres' third-round pick went to the Quebec Nordiques as the result of a trade on June 8, 1983 that sent Real Cloutier and Quebec's 1st-rd pick in 1983 NHL Entry Draft to Buffalo in exchange for Tony McKegney, Jean-Francois Sauve, Andre Savard and this pick.
 The Washington Capitals' third-round pick went to the Calgary Flames as the result of a trade on June 9, 1982 that sent Ken Houston and Pat Riggin to Washington in exchange for Howard Walker, George White, Washington's sixth-round pick in 1982 NHL Entry Draft, second-round pick in 1984 NHL Entry Draft and this pick.
 The Montreal Canadiens' third-round pick went to the Pittsburgh Penguins as the result of a trade on September 26, 1980 that had Montreal's option to swap third-round picks with Pittsburgh in exchange for Gilles Lupien.
 The Philadelphia Flyers' third-round pick went to the Hartford Whalers as the result of a trade on August 19, 1982 that sent Mark Howe and Hartford's third-round in 1983 NHL Entry Draft to Philadelphia in exchange for Greg Adams, Ken Linseman,  Philadelphia's first-round in 1983 NHL Entry Draft and this pick.

Round four

 The New Jersey Devils' fourth-round pick went to the New York Islanders as the result of a trade on October 1, 1982 that sent the Islanders fourth-round pick in 1983 NHL Entry Draft to New Jersey in exchange for Hector Marini and this pick.
 The Detroit Red Wings' fourth-round pick went to the Calgary Flames as the result of a trade on November 10, 1981 that sent Eric Vail to Detroit in exchange for Gary McAdam and this pick.
 The Los Angeles Kings' fourth-round pick went to the Detroit Red Wings as the result of a trade on June 8, 1983 that sent Detroit's fourth-round pick in 1984 NHL Entry Draft to Los Angeles in exchange for this pick.
 Los Angeles acquired this pick as the result of a trade on October 19, 1982 sent Greg Terrion to Toronto in exchange for this pick.
 The Quebec Nordiques' fourth-round pick went to the Hartford Whalers as the result of a trade on January 12, 1982 that sent John Garrett to Quebec in exchange for Michel Plasse and this pick.
 The New Jersey Devils' fourth-round pick went to the Calgary Flames as the result of a trade on November 25, 1981 that sent Don Lever and Bob MacMillan to Colorado in exchange for Lanny McDonald and this pick.  The Colorado Rockies relocated to New Jersey to become the Devils for the 1982-83 NHL season.
 New Jersey acquired this pick as the result of a trade on October 1, 1982 sent Hector Marini and New Jersey's fourth-round pick in 1983 NHL Entry Draft to the Islanders in exchange for this pick.

Round five

 The Pittsburgh Penguins' fifth-round pick went to the Toronto Maple Leafs as the result of a trade on February 3, 1982 that sent Greg Hotham to Pittsburgh in exchange for future considerations (Pittsburgh's 6th-rd pick in 1982 NHL Entry Draft) and this pick.
 The Hartford Whalers' fifth-round pick went to the New York Islanders as the result of a trade on October 2, 1981 that sent Garry Howatt to Hartford in exchange for this pick.
 The Toronto Maple Leafs' fourth-round pick went to the Detroit Red Wings as the result of a trade on March 8, 1982 that sent Jim Korn to Toronto in exchange for Toronto's 4th-rd pick in 1982 NHL Entry Draft and this pick.
 The Edmonton Oilers' fifth-round pick went to the Los Angeles Kings as the result of a trade on August 10, 1981 that sent Jay McFarlane to Edmonton in exchange for this pick.

Round six

 The Toronto Maple Leafs' sixth-round pick went to the Los Angeles Kings as the result of a trade on August 10, 1981 that sent Don Luce to Toronto in exchange for Bob Gladney and this pick.
 The Washington Capitals' sixth-round pick went to the Chicago Black Hawks as the result of a trade on August 24, 1982 that sent Ted Bulley and Dave Hutchison to Washington in exchange for Washington's 5th-rd pick in 1984 NHL Entry Draft and this pick.

Round seven

Round eight

 The Pittsburgh Penguins' eighth-round pick went to the Hartford Whalers as the result of a trade on December 29, 1981 that sent Rick MacLeish to Pittsburgh in exchange for Russ Anderson and this pick.

Round nine

Round ten

 The New York Rangers' tenth-round pick went to the Hartford Whalers as the result of a trade on February 2, 1982 that sent Rob McClanahan to  the Rangers in exchange for this pick.

Round eleven

 The Quebec Nordiques' eleventh-round pick went to the Minnesota North Stars as the result of a trade on June 9, 1982 that sent Minnesota's 12th-rd pick in 1982 NHL Entry Draft to Quebec in exchange for this pick. 
 The Minnesota North Stars' eleventh-round pick went to the Washington Capitals as the result of a trade on August 4, 1982 that sent Rollie Boutin and Wes Jarvis to Minnesota in exchange for Robbie Moore and this pick.

Round twelve

 The Washington Capitals' twelfth-round pick went to the Buffalo Sabres as the result of a trade on June 9, 1982 that sent Buffalo's 12th-rd pick in 1982 NHL Entry Draft to Washington in exchange for this pick. 
 The Chicago Black Hawks' twelfth-round pick went to the Quebec Nordiques as the result of a trade on June 8, 1983 that sent Quebec's 11th-rd pick in 1984 NHL Entry Draft to Chicago in exchange for this pick.

Draftees based on nationality

See also
 1983–84 NHL season
 List of NHL players

References

External links
 HockeyDraftCentral.com
 1983 NHL Entry Draft player stats at The Internet Hockey Database

National Hockey League Entry Draft
Draft